Turbot is a species of flatfish.

Turbot may also refer to:

 Turbot Island, a small Irish island
 Turbot Street, a major thoroughfare in Brisbane, Queensland, Australia
 Turbot Township, Northumberland County, Pennsylvania, United States
 Turbot War, a fishing dispute between Canada and the European Union
 USS Turbot, submarines named after the fish,
 "Turbot", a phantom ballplayer once thought to have played a Major League Baseball game in 1902
 Turbot-Rhino 1 and Turbot 2, fictive cars appearing in various Spirou & Fantasio comic strips
 Cap'n Turbot, a major character in the Canadian television series PAW Patrol
 The Turbot, a variation of the French fairy tale The Dolphin by Henriette-Julie de Murat